CFL is the Canadian Football League, a professional sports league in Canada.

CFL may also refer to:

Football leagues
 Calcutta Football League, in India
 Central Football League, in Scotland
 Česká fotbalová liga, in the Czech Republic
 Cheshire Football League, in England
 Continental Football League, in North America
 Montenegrin Football League: (Crnogorska Fudbalska Liga)
1. CFL - Montenegrin First League
2. CFL - Montenegrin Second League

Languages
 Chinese as a foreign language or second language is the study of the varieties of Chinese by non-native speakers
 College of Foreign Languages, a college of Vietnam National University, Hanoi
 Commission on the Filipino Language, a Philippine language regulator
 Context-free language, a formal language that is a member of the set of languages defined by context-free grammars

Politics
 Campaign for Liberty, an organization founded by United States Congressman Ron Paul
 Connecticut for Lieberman, the Connecticut political party created by twenty-five supporters of United States Senator Joe Lieberman
 Council of Four Lands, the central body of Jewish authority in Poland from 1580 to 1764

Science and technology
 Color–flavor locking, a special type of color superconductivity that is predicted to occur in very dense matter
 Compact fluorescent lamp/light, a type of fluorescent lamp that fits into a standard light bulb socket or small lighting fixture
 Compressed File Library, a virtual file system for programs
 Courant–Friedrichs–Lewy condition, a condition for convergence while solving partial differential equations

Trade unionism
 Ceylon Federation of Labour, an organisation bringing together trade unions in the private, semi-government and co-operative sectors of Sri Lanka
 Chicago Federation of Labor, the central labor body for over 300 Chicago area unions affiliated with the AFL-CIO
 Chinese Federation of Labour, a national trade union center in Taiwan

Transportation
 Contraflow Left, a type of road junction
 Caledonian MacBrayne Ferries, Ferry Operator in Scotland

Railways
 Caminhos de Ferro de Luanda, in Angola
 Chemin de fer Lanaudière, in Canada
 Compagnie du chemin de fer du Congo supérieur aux Grands Lacs africains in the Belgian Congo
 Société Nationale des Chemins de Fer Luxembourgeois, in Luxembourg